The Cleveland Elites were a Negro league baseball team in the Negro National League, based in Cleveland, Ohio, in 1926. In their only season, they failed to finish the second half of the season.

References

African-American history in Cleveland
Negro league baseball teams
Elites
Defunct baseball teams in Ohio
Baseball teams disestablished in 1926
Baseball teams established in 1926